Oshawa City Council is the governing body of the city of Oshawa, Ontario. The council has 11 members, consisting of 5 regional and city councillor and 5 city councillors plus the mayor. 

The city posts agendas for council and committee meetings.

History
Prior to 1985, city councillors were elected at large, with "regional and city" councillors who would serve on both city council and the Durham Region council, and "local city" councillors who would only serve on city council. From 1985-2010, the city moved to a ward-based system, ensuring equal representation for all residents. The city returned to at large elections in 2010 and 2014, before returning to a ward-based system in 2018.

Based on the current ward-based system, Oshawa voters elect:
 one candidate for Mayor, elected city-wide;
 one candidate for Regional & City Councillor, elected from their ward; and,
 one candidate for City Councillor, elected from their ward.

Committees
There are four standing committees of council:
 Community & Operations Services Committee
 Corporate & Finance Services Committee
 Economic & Development Services Committee
 Safety & Facilities Services Committee

Members

2022-2026
The current council elected in the 2022 Durham Region municipal elections:

2018-2022
Council elected in the 2018 Durham Region municipal elections:

2014-2018
Council elected in the 2014 Durham Region municipal elections:

References

External links
  of the Oshawa City Council

Municipal councils in Ontario
Politics of Oshawa
Municipal government of the Regional Municipality of Durham